Blepharomastix veritalis is a moth in the family Crambidae. It was described by Harrison Gray Dyar Jr. in 1914. It is found in Panama.

The wings are white with a slight bronzy tint and with blackish lines.

References

Blepharomastix
Moths described in 1914
Taxa named by Harrison Gray Dyar Jr.